Club Deportivo San Fernando is a Spanish football club based in San Fernando de Henares, in the Community of Madrid. Founded in 1929 it currently plays in Tercera División – Group 7, holding home games at Estadio Santiago del Pino.

History
San Fernando de Henares was born in 1929 under the name Sociedad Recreativa San Fernando, when several locals decide to create an amateur soccer team. In 1943 the club became federated and, on 21 October 1953, changed its name to Club Deportivo San Fernando.

San Fernando promoted to the first regional division in 1972–73, first reaching the fourth division five years later, and went on to remain in that level for the following three decades, returning to the Preferente in 2008–09, but promoting back immediately, as champions. In the 1980s the club won its first trophy, defeating CD Ciempozuelos in the first-ever Community of Madrid Cup.

In the 2006–07 season San Fernando finished third in the regular season, but fell short in the third division promotion playoffs, being ousted by CD Dénia.

Season to season

38 seasons in Tercera División

Play-off results 2007

Uniform
First kit: White shirt, shorts and socks.
Alternative kit: Black shirt, shorts and socks.

Stadium
C.D. San Fernando plays home matches at Estadio Santiago del Pino, with capacity for 1,300 spectators (seated). It has artificial turf (105 x 70) and a track field, and was inaugurated in a game with Real Madrid.

Previously, the team held its matches at Estadio Sánchez Lorbada, named as such after the neighbourhood in which it was located.

Former players
 Eloy

References

External links
Official website 
Futbolme team profile 
Futmadrid team profile 

Football clubs in the Community of Madrid
Association football clubs established in 1929
1929 establishments in Spain
San Fernando de Henares